The Threateners is a spy novel by Donald Hamilton first published in 1992. It is the twenty-sixth installment of the Matt Helm series, and saw the return of the main character after a three-year hiatus.

Plot summary
Matt Helm (code name: Eric) is assigned to kill a drug lord after the villain orders the murder of a journalist.  But he doesn't kill the drug lord's dog, raising the central moral question of the book: to what extent can we blame the supplier of drugs for the fact that is that there is demand for drugs?

The story starts in Santa Fe where Matt is trying to live a normal life with Jo Beckman from the previous novel "The Frighteners". At the beginning of the story, Jo has left Matt because he has taken up shooting as a hobby. One of the characters from a previous novel "The Infiltrators", Madeleine Ellershaw, comes to visit Matt with a complaint that he's having her followed. Matt, however, is being followed by the same kind of people.

Madeleine dies violently soon after her appearance. Matt's new friend Mark, who introduced Matt to shooting, also dies, soon after revealing that he was an author hunted by a South American drug lord for writing a book about the drug business, and that there was a price of one million dollars on his head.

After Mark's death, Matt unwillingly teams up with his widow to find back up copies of Mark's second book. Hamilton uses computer jargon and concepts are mentioned when the electronic copies of the book are mentioned. As usual nothing and nobody is as they seem or are expected.

As usual also, Matt undergoes torture and captivity and perils to his life. As usual, he emerges victorious, accomplishing his mission, saving the women and killing the bad guys. Hamilton doesn't deal in the Hollywood-hero-that-can-kill-a-hundred-black-hat-types and Matt is shown to have a better than average amount of brains, professional ruthlessness, and a blance of courage and good sense.

In this book Matt runs into fanatic world-savers and drug-crusaders, both of which are gunning for his life. The story opens and ends in New Mexico, but the majority of it takes place in South America.

External links
Synopsis and summary

1992 American novels
Matt Helm novels